The Illinois Music Education Association (ILMEA) is the Illinois state-level affiliate of National Association for Music Education. It formed in 1941 out of the previous Illinois School Music Association.

ILMEA offers support to Illinois music educators through ongoing professional development opportunities, including the annual Illinois Music Education Conference held in Peoria, Illinois, in conjunction with the student All-State programs.

Students in Illinois audition to perform in an ILMEA ensemble (band, chorus, orchestra, jazz band or vocal jazz ensemble) within one of nine geographic districts. Based on that audition, Senior Level (high school) students may be invited to participate in the annual Illinois All-State Student Programs. There are also opportunities for those students considering careers in music education (Future Music Educators Seminar). The ILMEA Student Composition Competition is one of the largest and most robust of its kind in the country. Open to students in grades 6-12, students may enter original traditional ensemble repertoire, as well as original works in the singer-songwriter, commercial, rap/hip hop and modern band categories as well as arranging categories. 

At the junior high level, students audition to perform in an ILMEA band, orchestra, choir or jazz band in one of the nine geographic districts. To be eligible, student musicians must be active members, in good standing, in the appropriate music ensemble at their school.

References

External links 

 Official website

Music organizations based in the United States
National Association for Music Education
Education in Illinois